Epsilon Circini, Latinized from ε Circini, is a solitary star located in the southern constellation of Circinus. It is faintly visible to the naked eye, having an apparent visual magnitude of 4.86. It is drifting closer to the Sun with a radial velocity of −4 km/s.

This is an evolved K-type giant star with a stellar classification of K2.5 III. With the supply of hydrogen at its core exhausted, the star has cooled and expanded to 28.5 times the girth of the Sun. It radiates about 290 times the solar luminosity from its photosphere at an effective temperature of 4,457 K.

References

Circini, Epsilon
Circinus (constellation)
Circini, Epsilon
Durchmusterung objects
135291
074837
5666